Chris McDonald may refer to:

 Christopher McDonald (born 1955), American actor
 Chris McDonald (soccer) (born 1975), retired American soccer player
 Chris McDonald (engineer) (born 1977), English CEO
 Chris McDonald (footballer) (born 1975), Scottish footballer